Norman Duncan Kemp Smith, FBA, FRSE (5 May 1872 – 3 September 1958) was a Scottish philosopher who was Professor of Psychology (1906–1914) and Philosophy (1914–1919) at Princeton University and was Professor of Logic and Metaphysics at the University of Edinburgh (1919–1945).

He is noted for his 1929 English translation of Immanuel Kant's Critique of Pure Reason, which is often considered the standard version.

Early life and education
He was born Norman Smith on 5 May 1872 in Dundee, Scotland, the son of a cabinet-maker on the Nethergate.

He was educated in Dundee and then studied mental philosophy at the University of St Andrews, graduating with an MA with first-class honours in 1893. He received his doctorate (PhD) in 1902.

Career

He lectured in philosophy and psychology at Princeton University from 1906 to 1916, and at the University of Edinburgh from 1919 until his retirement in 1945.

He was elected a Fellow of the Royal Society of Edinburgh in 1921. His proposers were Ralph Allan Sampson, Thomas James Jehu, Charles Glover Barkla and Charles Sarolea.

In 1932 he delivered the Adamson Lecture of the Victoria University of Manchester.

In 1938 he moved to 14 Kilgraston Road in south Edinburgh, a house designed by Sir Robert Matthew.

His translation of Immanuel Kant's Critique of Pure Reason is often used as the standard English version of the text. His commentaries on the Critique are also well regarded, as are his works on David Hume and other philosophers. He was president of the Aristotelian Society from 1947 to 1948. A portrait by the Edinburgh artist Adam Bruce Thomson is held by the University of Edinburgh's Fine Art Collection.

Kemp Smith died on 3 September 1958 in Edinburgh.

Family

In 1910 he married Amy Kemp (d.1936), and thereafter became known as Norman Kemp Smith.

Legacy
The Kemp Smith Room in the University of Edinburgh's Philosophy Department is named in his honour.

Books and articles
Studies in the Cartesian Philosophy (New York: Macmillan, 1902)
"The Naturalism of Hume (I)" and "The Naturalism of Hume (II)", Mind, 14 (1905) Nos. 54 and 55: 149–73 and 335–47
"Subjectivism and Realism in Modern Philosophy", The Philosophical Review, 17 (1908) No. 2: 138–48
"How Far Is Agreement Possible in Philosophy?", The Journal of Philosophy, Psychology, and Scientific Methods, 9 (1912) No. 26: 701–11
"Kant’s Relation to Hume and Leibniz", The Philosophical Review, 24 (1915) No. 3: 288–96
A Commentary to Kant's 'Critique of Pure Reason''' (London: Macmillan, 1918)
Prolegomena to an Idealist Theory of Knowledge (London: Macmillan, 1924)The Philosophy of David Hume: A Critical Study of Its Origins and Central Doctrines (London: Macmillan, 1941)New Studies in the Philosophy of Descartes (1951)
 The Credibility of Divine Existence. The Collected Papers of Norman Kemp Smith, edited by A. J. D. Porteous, R. D. MacLennan, and G. E. Davie (1967)

References

Further reading
Loeb, Louis E. (2009). What is Worth Preserving in the Kemp Smith Interpretation of Hume? British Journal for the History of Philosophy, 17(4), 769–797.

External links
Profile of Kemp Smith on the Edinburgh University Philosophy Department site
 
 
 Online edition of Kemp Smith's translation of the Critique of Pure Reason
Norman Kemp Smith (1872-1958) hosted by The Hume Society, selected from Geoffrey Gorham, Continuum Encyclopedia of British Philosophy'' (2006), ed. A.C. Grayling, Naomi Goulder, and Andrew Pyle
Norman Kemp Smith (1872–1958) portrait painting by Adam Bruce Thomson - hosted at Art.uk
Norman Kemp Smith bromide print by Walter Stoneman from 10 November 1947 - hosted by the National Portrait Gallery

1872 births
1958 deaths
People from Dundee
People educated at the High School of Dundee
People educated at Harris Academy
Alumni of the University of St Andrews
Princeton University faculty
Academics of the University of Edinburgh
German–English translators
Scottish logicians
Metaphysicians
Scottish philosophers
Scottish psychologists
Fellows of the Royal Society of Edinburgh
Presidents of the Aristotelian Society
Translators of Immanuel Kant